Revathikkoru Pavakkutty (Translation: A doll for Revathi) is a 1986 Malayalam film by Sathyan Anthikkad starring Bharath Gopi, Mohanlal and Radha.  The film is an adaptation of the stage play of the same name by Ravi Vallathol.

Synopsis
Revathi's (Lizy) parents separated when she was young; she was raised by her mother, who taught her that her father (Bharath Gopi) was a bad man. Years later, while on his deathbed, her father makes a last wish to see his daughter. Revathi refuses to go, so her orphan friend Susanna (Radha) goes in her place to fulfill his wish. Revathi's father is very happy to be with Susanna, thinking she is Revathy but Susanna dies. Finally Revathy returns home after the death of Susanna, but her visit fails to move a grief-stricken father.

Cast
Bharath Gopi as Balan Menon
Mohanlal as Dr. P. Madhavankutty
Radha as Susanna
Menaka as Indu
Lizy as Revathi Menon
Sukumari as Devootty
Innocent as Bhasi Pillai
Bahadoor as Ayyappan Pillai
Jagathy Sreekumar as Kalyan Kumar
Mala Aravindan as Vaidyar Rarichan Nair

Soundtrack

References

External links
 
 Revathikkoru Pavakkutty at Oneindia.in

1980s Malayalam-language films
1986 drama films
1986 films
Films directed by Sathyan Anthikad
Indian drama films